FC Bakit Mailuu-Suu is a Kyrgyzstani football club based in Mailuu-Suu that plays in the top division in Kyrgyzstan, the Kyrgyzstan League.

History 
1997: Founded as FC Alga Mailuu-Suu.
1998: Renamed to FC Svetotekhnika Mailuu-Suu.
2007: Renamed to FC Mailuu-Suu.
2008: Renamed to FC Bakit Mailuu-Suu.

Achievements
Kyrgyzstan League:
10th place, Zone B: 1998

Kyrgyzstan Cup:
1/8 finals: 1998, 1999, 2001

Current squad

Football clubs in Kyrgyzstan
1997 establishments in Kyrgyzstan
Association football clubs established in 1997